Joshua Alexander Gatt (born August 29, 1991) is an American professional soccer player.

Club career

Early career
Born in Plymouth, Michigan, Gatt played varsity for four years at Detroit Catholic Central High School. He also played in the U.S. Soccer Development Academy for the Michigan Wolves, known now as the Crew SC Academy Wolves.

Rheindorf Altach
Gatt first attracted attention as a Michigan-area youth player when his club competed in a tournament against European academy teams in Switzerland. Through the SuperElite system, the winger was offered trials at 1. FSV Mainz 05 and at SCR Altach and eventually received an offer from the latter club.

Gatt proceeded to sign with SC Rheindorf Altach, leaving behind an opportunity to play at Indiana University. Upon his arrival in Austria in the summer of 2010, he immediately joined the first team, and scored 5 goals in 14 matches.

Molde
On January 12, 2011 it was announced that Gatt had joined Norwegian side Molde, and was among Ole Gunnar Solskjær's first signings as manager together with Davy Claude Angan and Magnus Wolff Eikrem. He made his debut against Sarpsborg 08 on March 18. He scored his first goal on July 30 against Vålerenga.
Josh scored his second goal in as many games on August 4 against Start.

In the first half of the 2012 season, Gatt scored goals against Strømsgodset, Stabæk and Vålerenga. According to himself he also scored a goal against Sandnes Ulf, but the official statistics count that one to Mattias Moström.

On June 29, 2013, during the first half of Molde's home Tippeligaen match against Sarpsborg 08, Gatt seriously injured his knee, ruling him out for the remainder of the season and requiring surgery. Gatt also missed the entire 2014 season. After almost 21 months out injured, Gatt was finally cleared to play again on April 20, 2015. Gatt made his long-awaited return for Molde on May 22, 2015, but his lasted only 4 minutes before feeling "....pain and insecurity..." in his knee, resulting in a third operation on the troublesome knee. Over a year later, September 11, 2016, Gatt again made his return for Molde, coming on as a 67th minute substitute for Harmeet Singh.

United States
Gatt left Molde at the end of 2016, going on trial with 1. FC Nürnberg in January 2017, before signing with MLS team Minnesota United on February 15, 2017.

On March 31, 2017 Minnesota United FC traded Gatt, Mohammed Saeid, and an international roster spot to Colorado Rapids for Marc Burch and Sam Cronin. His option was declined at the end of the 2017 season.

During the 2017 offseason, Gatt's wife Melissa was diagnosed with cancer. While acting as his wife's caregiver during chemotherapy, he played one game for NPSL club Detroit City FC. After her cancer went into remission, he re-joined Rheindorf Altach in June 2018. On July 16, 2018, Gatt officially signed with Rheindorf Altach.

Dundalk
On June 23, 2020, Gatt signed for League of Ireland Premier Division club Dundalk. Gatt made his debut for the club in the FAI Cup against Waterford F.C. on August 11.

Gatt left Dundalk in November 2020.

Pittsburgh Riverhounds
On February 11, 2021, Gatt joined USL Championship side Pittsburgh Riverhounds SC.

International career
Gatt was called up to the United States national team on September 2, 2012, but he had to withdraw due a hamstring injury. He made his international debut on November 14, 2012 in a friendly match versus Russia. Gatt was originally named to the 23-man roster for the 2013 CONCACAF Gold Cup, but was later ruled out for the tournament after picking up a knee injury in a match on June 29 against Sarpsborg 08 FF.

Style of play
When Gatt was signed by Molde, Solskjær stated that he had signed an attacking player with a fast pace who can play on the right wing, left wing, and as a striker. Gatt has run a self-timed 100 meters in 11.00 seconds.

Personal life
Gatt's wife, Melissa, was diagnosed with cancer in early 2018. Without a club, Gatt set up a ‘Go Fund Me’ page for her treatment which was contributed to by a number of his former teammates. As of June 2018, they had raised $78,000, and Melissa's cancer was in remission.

Career statistics

Club

International

Honors

Club
Molde
Tippeligaen: 2011, 2012, 2014
Norwegian Cup: 2013, 2014

References

External links
 

Living people
1991 births
People from Plymouth, Michigan
Association football wingers
Soccer players from Detroit
American soccer players
SC Rheindorf Altach players
Molde FK players
Minnesota United FC players
Colorado Rapids players
Detroit City FC players
Eliteserien players
Major League Soccer players
National Premier Soccer League players
American expatriate soccer players
Expatriate footballers in Austria
Expatriate footballers in Norway
Expatriate association footballers in Ireland
American expatriate sportspeople in Austria
American expatriate sportspeople in Norway
American expatriate sportspeople in Ireland
United States men's under-20 international soccer players
United States men's international soccer players
Dundalk F.C. players
League of Ireland players
Detroit Catholic Central High School alumni
Pittsburgh Riverhounds SC players